"Band Aid Covers the Bullet Hole" is the first single by Los Angeles, California rock band Scarling.  It was released in the USA on 7" vinyl on March 19, 2003, on the Sympathy for the Record Industry label, and on compact disc on December 16.
The lyric "Say hello to my little friend" on the chorus of the title track "Band Aid Covers the Bullet Hole"  is a line from the film Scarface.

Band Aid Covers the Bullet Hole (the song) has two different versions and the one released on this single has a one word change. "Robots steal emotions", later changed to "Robots steal narcotics" for the album Sweet Heart Dealer.
 
The CD features an additional track, a cover of Radiohead's "Creep".

On March 12, 2006, an episode of the medical drama Grey's Anatomy titled "Band-Aid Covers the Bullet Hole" was aired.

Track listing
"Band Aid Covers the Bullet Hole" – 3:32
"H/C" – 2:29
"Creep" – 3:52 (CD single only)

Personnel
Jessicka – vocals
Christian Hejnal – guitar, vocals, bass
Rickey Lime – guitar
Garey Snider – drums
Chris Vrenna – producer
Erik Colvin – mixing
Mark Ryden – cover artwork

References

2003 singles
Scarling. songs
Sympathy for the Record Industry singles
2003 songs